Elias Walfrid Sopanen (28 September 1863, – 8 April 1926) was a Finnish judge, farmer and politician. He was born in Savonlinna, and belonged at first to the Young Finnish Party but, after its disbandment in 1918, he joined the National Progressive Party. He was Minister of Justice from 21 December 1923 to 18 January 1924. Sopanen served as a Member of the Parliament of Finland from 1913 to 1916.

References

1863 births
1926 deaths
People from Savonlinna
People from Mikkeli Province (Grand Duchy of Finland)
Young Finnish Party politicians
National Progressive Party (Finland) politicians
Ministers of Justice of Finland
Government ministers of Finland
Members of the Parliament of Finland (1913–16)
People of the Finnish Civil War (White side)
University of Helsinki alumni